Trottiscliffe is a village in Kent, England about  north west of West Malling.

It is often incorrectly spelled Trosley after Trosley Country Park at the top of the North Downs, which was once part of the Trosley Towers Estate. The spelling Trottesclyve  appears with nearby Hallyng in 1396.

Labelled as Trotterscliffe on the Ordnance Survey map published in 1870.

Historic buildings
Its most notable features are the neolithic Coldrum Long Barrow and the medieval Church of St. Peter and St. Paul.

Notable residents
Trottiscliffe was the English home of artist Graham Sutherland from 1937 until his death in 1980. He was buried by Trottiscliffe parish church.

References

External links

 Trottiscliffe History Project

Villages in Kent
Civil parishes in Kent